Hypsantyx is a genus of parasitoid wasps belonging to the family Ichneumonidae.

The species of this genus are found in Europe.

Species:
 Hypsantyx lituratoria (Linnaeus, 1761)

References

Ichneumonidae
Ichneumonidae genera